The Bone of Contention is a Big Finish Productions audio drama featuring Lisa Bowerman as Bernice Summerfield, a character from the spin-off media based on the long-running British science fiction television series Doctor Who.

Plot 
Bernice visits the home of the Galyari to recover an artefact for the Perloran government. The job is complicated when a young Galyari latches onto her.

Cast
Bernice Summerfield - Lisa Bowerman
Mordecan - Robin Bowerman
Director Tseshra - Tracey Childs
Commander Korshal - Steffan Rhodri

Notes
Mordecan, played by Robin Bowerman, previously appeared in the Sixth Doctor audio drama The Sandman whereas Commander Korshal, played by Steffan Rohdri, previously appeared in the Seventh Doctor audio drama Dreamtime.

External links
Big Finish Productions - Professor Bernice Summerfield: The Bone of Contention

Bernice Summerfield audio plays
Fiction set in the 27th century